The Sky Open 2013 is the men's edition of the 2013 Sky Open, which is a tournament of the PSA World Tour event International (prize money: 50 000 $). The event took place in Cairo in Egypt from 19 November to 23 November. Mohamed El Shorbagy won his first Sky Open trophy, beating Karim Darwish in the final.

Prize money and ranking points
For 2013, the prize purse was $50,000. The prize money and points breakdown is as follows:

Seeds

Draw and results

See also
PSA World Tour 2013
Sky Open

References

External links
PSA Sky Open 2013 website
Sky Open official website

Squash tournaments in Egypt
Sky Open
Sky Open
Sky Open